Bülövaqaya settlement is an archeological site located on the left bank of the Sarisu river, west of Göynük village of Babek district.

Description
Many features of the ceramic group found in the settlement, such as the technology of preparation, cooking, pattern, bear close resemblance to Dalma-type ceramics. The painted ceramics found here are similar to the settlements in northwestern Iran characterized by Kul Tepe Jolfa, Seh Gabi and other Dalma-type ceramics. Archaeological excavations carried out in the settlement of Bülövqaya are important in terms of studying the distribution of Dalma culture in the South Caucasus.

References

Tells (archaeology)
Prehistoric sites in Azerbaijan
Archaeological sites in Azerbaijan
Ancient pottery
Chalcolithic sites of Asia